Bard Cottage Cemetery is a World War I, Commonwealth War Graves Commission burial ground near Ypres, Belgium. It is home to 1607 identified casualties. The cemetery is half a kilometre north of Essex Farm Cemetery.

References

External links 
 
 Official website

Commonwealth War Graves Commission cemeteries in Belgium
Cemeteries and memorials in West Flanders
World War I cemeteries in Belgium